Ernest Leslie Page (27 September 1910 – 9 December 1973) was an English athlete who competed for Great Britain in the 1932 Summer Olympics.

He was born in Lambeth and died in Torquay.

In 1932 he was eliminated in the quarter-finals of the 100 metres event. He was also a member of the British relay team which finished sixth in the 4×100 metres competition.

At the 1930 Empire Games he won the silver medal in the 100 yards contest.

Competition record

External links
sports-reference.com

1910 births
1973 deaths
People from Lambeth
Athletes from London
English male sprinters
Olympic athletes of Great Britain
Athletes (track and field) at the 1932 Summer Olympics
Athletes (track and field) at the 1930 British Empire Games
Commonwealth Games silver medallists for England
Commonwealth Games medallists in athletics
Medallists at the 1930 British Empire Games